Kenneth Alexander Keith, Baron Keith of Castleacre (30 August 1916 – 1 September 2004) was a British businessman and banker.

Keith was invested as a Knight in 1969 and was created a life peer as Baron Keith of Castleacre, of Swaffham in the County of Norfolk on 6 February 1980.

He presided over the mergers that formed the British merchant bank Hill Samuel, and also chaired Rolls-Royce after the company's receivership and subsequent nationalisation in 1971, helping to organise the recovery of the RB211 project. After retiring from those chairmanships in 1980 he was chairman of STC and of Beecham.

"We (Rolls-Royce) added a zero to his stature; he used to think £5 million a lot of money, but after a few weeks on the RB211 he came to understand that £50 million is peanuts." – Stanley Hooker.

References

1916 births
British bankers
2004 deaths
Conservative Party (UK) life peers
Life peers created by Elizabeth II